The 2014 South Alabama Jaguars football team represented the University of South Alabama in the 2014 NCAA Division I FBS football season. They were led by sixth-year head coach Joey Jones and played their home games at Ladd–Peebles Stadium in Mobile, Alabama as a member of the Sun Belt Conference. They finished the season 6–7, 5–3 in Sun Belt play to finish in a three way tie for fourth place. In only their second year of bowl eligibility, they were invited to the Camellia Bowl, where they lost to Bowling Green.

Schedule

Game summaries

Kent State

Mississippi State

Georgia Southern

Idaho

Appalachian State

Georgia State

Troy

Louisiana–Lafayette

Arkansas State

Texas State

South Carolina

Navy

Bowling Green–Camellia Bowl

References

South Alabama
South Alabama Jaguars football seasons
South Alabama Jaguars football